Blood tax may refer to:
 The Devşirme of the Ottoman Empire
 The Formosa blood tax instituted by Hans Putmans
 The Japanese Conscription Ordinance of 1873 that led to the Blood tax riots